Aurora St. Luke's Medical Center is a private hospital located in Milwaukee, Wisconsin. It is one of the 15 hospitals of Aurora Health Care, a non-profit health care system founded in 1984 and headquartered in Milwaukee, Wisconsin.

References

Hospitals in Wisconsin